Matteo Zennaro (born 30 April 1976) is an Italian fencer. He won a bronze medal in the team foil event at the 2000 Summer Olympics.

During and after the rehabilitation, the sports periodization of the strength training is done under the guide of the strength coach,  Master Paolo Tassetto.

References

External links
 

1976 births
Living people
Italian male foil fencers
Olympic fencers of Italy
Fencers at the 2000 Summer Olympics
Olympic bronze medalists for Italy
Olympic medalists in fencing
Sportspeople from Venice
Medalists at the 2000 Summer Olympics
Mediterranean Games silver medalists for Italy
Mediterranean Games medalists in fencing
Competitors at the 2005 Mediterranean Games